Edward Canfor-Dumas (born 1957) is a novelist and an award-winning TV scriptwriter - and a specialist in conflict management.

After winning a scholarship to Latymer Upper School, Hammersmith, he read English Literature at New College, Oxford. Soon after, he started penning scripts for popular television series such as The Bill and Kavanagh QC. His first major feature-length programme was Tough Love, a powerful drama about police corruption, starring Ray Winstone. He then wrote the drama for the highly acclaimed BBC drama-documentary Pompeii: The Last Day, which was nominated for a BAFTA, and followed this in 2005 with Supervolcano.

He branched out into novels in the same year, with the successful modern story The Buddha, Geoff and Me, which he followed in 2014 with Bodhisattva Blues. Edward is a practising Buddhist and both books have Buddhist themes. He also ghostwrote The Buddha in Daily Life (1988) for Richard Causton.

In 2006 Edward took a lead role in establishing the All-Party Parliamentary Group on Conflict Issues, which was launched in February 2007, and in 2011 he co-founded Engi, a social enterprise that works with the private sector, civil society, government and the military to manage conflict and reduce violence. He is currently co-leading a multinational project - Understand to Prevent - which is exploring an expanded role for the military in the prevention of violent conflict, and has recently joined the Strategy Forum of the UK's Chief of the Defence Staff.

He lives with his wife, Coralyn, in Hertfordshire near London, and has a son and a daughter, Alexander and Emily.

References

External links
 

1957 births
Living people
English television writers
21st-century English novelists
People educated at Latymer Upper School
Alumni of New College, Oxford
English male novelists
21st-century English male writers
British male television writers
21st-century British screenwriters